Gemmula pseudogranosa is a species of sea snail, a marine gastropod mollusk in the family Turridae, the turrids.

Description
The length of the shell attains 20.9 mm.

Distribution
This marine species occurs off Japan, Taiwan and in the East China Sea.

References

 Nomura, S., 1940: Mollusca dredged by the Husa-maru from the Pacific coast of Tiba Prefecture, Japan. Rec Oceanogr Works Japan 12(1): 81-116
 Tsuchida E. & Hori S. (1996). Marine mollusks around Mishima and Tsunoshima Islands, Japan Sea collected by the R/V Tansei-Maru. Bulletin of the National Science Museum, ser. A, Zoology. 22(4): 219-261
 Tucker, J.K. (2004) Catalog of Recent and fossil turrids (Mollusca: Gastropoda). Zootaxa, 682, 1–1295
 Liu, J.Y. [Ruiyu] (ed.). (2008). Checklist of marine biota of China seas. China Science Press. 1267 pp.
 Li B. [Baoquan] & Li X. [Xinzheng]. (2008). Report on the turrid genera Gemmula, Lophiotoma and Ptychosyrinx (Gastropoda: Turridae: Turrinae) from the China seas. Zootaxa. 1778: 1-25.

External links
 Biolib.cz: Gemmula pseudogranosa
  Tucker, J.K. 2004 Catalog of recent and fossil turrids (Mollusca: Gastropoda). Zootaxa 682:1-1295.

pseudogranosa
Gastropods described in 1940